Julien Castellini (born 3 July 1975) is a Monegasque alpine skier. He competed in the men's super-G at the 1994 Winter Olympics.

References

External links
 

1975 births
Living people
Monegasque male alpine skiers
Olympic alpine skiers of Monaco
Alpine skiers at the 1994 Winter Olympics
Sportspeople from Nice